Bolton Lake may refer to:

In Canada:
Bolton Lake (British Columbia)
Bolton Lake (Manitoba)
Bolton Lake (New Brunswick)
 In Ontario
Bolton Lake (Cochrane District, Ontario)
Bolton Lake (Kenora District)
Bolton Lake (Timiskaming District)
Bolton Lake (Saskatchewan)

See also 
 Bolton Lakes (Ontario)